Centennial Park (formerly Elliott Bay Park) is an  public park in Seattle, in the U.S. state of Washington, owned and operated by the Port of Seattle.

References

Parks in Seattle